Fred C. Beyer High School is a high school in Modesto, California, located in the Stanislaus County.

Facilities
Although when it was opened in 1972 to an enrollment of 975. Beyer was originally designed to serve approximately 2000 students. By the time the first class of freshman had advanced to seniority, enrollment was about 1800. With the addition of numerous portable buildings, the number of enrolled students was as high as 3150, but since Enochs High School opened, enrollment has returned to 1800.

When built, Beyer was on the outskirts of the city, in northeast Modesto. In anticipation of the 1976 United States Bicentennial, the Patriots were chosen as the school's mascot, and the school colors chosen as red, white, and blue.

Beyer High was intended to incorporate the latest advances in the science of education, the most prominent of which was Daily Demand Scheduling (DDS). The DDS or Modular Scheduling as it was called was controversial and ultimately was a dismal failure. It gave students the ability to arrange their class schedule each day. Oversight of the student scheduling and meeting class requirements was not tracked closely by the Beyer Staff and consequently many students failed to meet graduation requirements. Simply put, if a student liked a particular class, then they could schedule the entire day in that class. Sadly, there was never even one apology from the Modesto City School Board to all the students that failed to graduate high school due to their short-sighted desire to be different, regardless of the impact it had on many students that were used as guinea pigs. DDS was terminated in 1981-82 school year by a decision of the Modesto City School Board of Trustees, due to the outcry from parents and past students.

Debate and competitive speech teams
Under the tutelage of Ron Underwood, Beyer's competitive speech and debate teams and individual competitors won numerous state and national awards in the National Forensics League.

Athletics

Football
Former member of the Central California Conference (CCC). Current member of the Modesto Metropolitan Conference (MMC). Coach Doug Severe led the Beyer Patriots to their first trip to the Sac-Joaquin Section Playoffs in 2006.  In 2007 the Beyer Patriots made their second trip to the Sac-Joaquin Section Playoffs.

Severe played on the 1975 Beyer football team, led by coach Dean Laun, (nicknamed, the Laun Mower), when Beyer won the CCC title while allowing opponents a total of 28 points, including the post-season.  There being no Sac-Joaquin Section playoffs in the 1970s, Beyer and Stagg High School played a Sac-Joaquin post-season game called the Turkey Bowl.

In 2011, Beyer's varsity football team went undefeated in league, and 8-2 overall. They beat Downey in decision to who won the MMC title, and won that in their division, continuing to proceed into the playoffs.

Baseball

Beyer's baseball team frequently won conference championships in the 1970s.

Won frequent conference championships in the 1980s including a C.I.F. Sac-Joaquin Section AAA Tournament 2nd-place finish under P. Cornwell in 1985.

Basketball

Beyer basketball saw a number of conference championships under coach Davis.

Beyer boys' basketball went to the Sac-Joaquin Section Championship games in 2017 and 2018 under head coach Kyle McKim. Boys' basketball also won their first CIF State playoff game in 2017.

Cross-country

Beyer boys' cross-country team has taken three Division I Sac-Joaquin Section (Master's) championships.

Beyer girls' cross-country team went undefeated in the Central California Conference for six years (1994–1999).

Golf

Beyer's golf team usually competed in section playoffs and occasionally went to state finals under coach Streeter.

Swim team and water polo
Coached by Kirk Lindsey in the 70s, and now Eric Corgiat, was very successful in winning multiple league and section titles.

Wrestling
Coached by Doug Severe, Beyer High has had several wrestlers place at the California Interscholastic Federation (CIF) State Wrestling Championships.

Notable alumni

 Eric Bell, MLB player (1985–1993)
 Daniel Da Prato, college football coach
 Timothy Olyphant – class of 1986, Primetime Emmy-nominated actor
 Jeremy Renner – class of 1989, Oscar-nominated actor
 Joel N. Ward

References

External links
 

Educational institutions established in 1972
High schools in Stanislaus County, California
Education in Modesto, California
Public high schools in California
1972 establishments in California